A diabolo or diablo is a prop used in juggling.

Diabolo may also refer to:
 Diabolo (manga), a 2001 manga set in Japan
 The most common air gun pellet, design
 The Diabolo project, a railway line serving Brussels Airport
 In mathematics, the second polyabolo
 Diabolus, the devil
 Diabolo (drink), a non-alcoholic mixed drink, popular in France, consisting of a lemonade mixed with a syrup.
 Tritone, a musical interval referred to as diabolo
 Diabolo, a genus of moths
 Diabolo (film), a 1992 Ghanaian  film

See also
Devil sticks, a similar juggling prop to the diabolo
Diablo (disambiguation)
Diavolo (disambiguation)